Iran–Spain relations are the bilateral and diplomatic relations between these two countries. Iran has an embassy in Madrid, Spain has an embassy in Tehran.

Diplomatic relations 
Diplomatic relations between Spain and Iran have an absence of bilateral disputes. Spain is considered in Iran as a friendly country and one of the countries of the European Union with a better image.

The Iranian Alans were one of the people groups to settle Spain after the fall of the Roman Empire, but both countries have experienced Arab conquest after the initial expansion of Islam in the 700s. After the outbreak of a revolution in Arab-occupied Iran, the Umayyad Caliph fled to Spain. Timur, the Transoxanian ruler of Iran, bestowed a high position of honor to the Castilian Ambassador in the early 15th century, an affront to the Chinese ambassador.

When the Ottomans began threatening Europe, Western kingdoms including Spain looked to Iran as a potential ally against the Ottomans; Charles, then king of Spain as Charles I, sent an envoy to the Shah of Iran in 1516-1519 with this purpose in mind. On 18 February 1529, Charles V, deeply alarmed by the Ottoman progression towards Vienna, again sent a letter from Toledo to Shah Ismail, who had died in 1524 and had been replaced by Shah Tahmasp, pleading for a military diversion. His ambassador to the Shah was the knight of Saint John de Balbi, and an alliance was made with the objective of making an attack on the Ottoman Empire in the west and the east within the following year. Tahmasp also responded by expressing his friendship to the Emperor. A decision was thus taken to attack the Ottoman Empire on both fronts, but Balbi took more than one year to return to the Iran, and by that time the situation had changed in Iran, as Iran was forced to make peace with the Ottoman Empire because of an insurrection of the Shaybanid Uzbeks.  Contacts heightened with the Persian embassy to Europe (1599-1602), the final portion of which took place in Spain, where the Iranians met with king Philip III, and obtained seaborne transportation from Portugal to the Strait of Hormuz and Persia. In a final incident however, one of the members of the embassy, a religious mullah, was stabbed to death by a Spaniard in Mérida. The Iranians sent another embassy after 1609, but relations worsened when Shah Abbas seized Portuguese Hormuz.

Iran and Spain were among the only few countries to protest the 18th-century partitions of Poland.

As for the evolution of these relations, there is a parallel between Spain and a good part of the rest of the EU countries. The certain thaw in relations with President Aznar's visit to Iran in 2002 and President Khatami's visit to Spain that same year, was followed by President Ahmadinejad's eight years. From the events of 2009 and the worsening of the nuclear issue, official relations between Iran and Spain, as a member of the EU, were affected, especially with the approval of EU sanctions in January 2012, its entry into force in the summer of that year and its hardening in subsequent months. The expression of this situation is the absence of official trips, delegations or visits of senior officials between the two countries between 2010 and the fall of 2013.

Economic relations 
Iran was among the three largest suppliers of crude oil to Spain in 2011, with almost 14% of imported oil. The situation has changed radically with the approval of the EU sanctions establishing the total cessation of these imports. Spain has been the second EU country most affected after Greece and Italy.

In 2011, the last year before the sanctions, Spanish exports to Iran reached €655.3M, increasing by 33.2% against a 7.3% drop in the EU. Between 2009 and 2011 Spanish exports to Iran grew by almost 50%.

In a global context, Spain accounted for 0.8% of total Iranian imports in 2011 and was the 21st supplier. For Spain, Iran was the 46th largest customer in the world, with 0.31% of total exports Spanish.

Cooperation 
Iran has never had development cooperation agreements with Spain. Iran does not have a financial program with Spain. In any case, as of UN Resolution 1747 of March 24, 2007, and under the provisions of point 7, it is not possible to grant Iran concessional financing except for humanitarian reasons.

Diplomacy

Republic of Iran
Madrid (Embassy)

Kingdom of Spain
Tehran (Embassy)

Gallery

See also 
 Foreign relations of Iran 
 Foreign relations of Spain
 Iranians in Spain
 Iran–European Union relations

References 

 
Spain
Iran